Open water swimming competition at the 2014 Asian Beach Games was held in Phuket, Thailand from 15 to 17 November 2014 at Karon Beach.

Medalists

Men

Women

Medal table

Results

Men

5 km
15 November

10 km
17 November

Women

5 km
15 November

10 km
17 November

References

External links 
 

2014 Asian Beach Games events
Asian Beach Games
2014